Blade of grass may refer to:
 Grass blade, the leaf of a grass
 Blade of grass sign, in radiology
 "Blade of Grass", an episode of Adventure Time
 "A Blade of Grass" (Penny Dreadful episode)

See also 
 No Blade of Grass
 A Single Blade of Grass